Mason Township is the name of some places in the U.S. state of Michigan:

 Mason Township, Arenac County, Michigan
 Mason Township, Cass County, Michigan

See also 
 Mason, Michigan, a city in Ingham County

Michigan township disambiguation pages